Macropharyngodon geoffroy, also known as the Geoffroy's wrasse, is a member of the wrasse family endemic to the Hawaiian Islands. It occasionally makes its way into the aquarium trade. This benthopelagic species occurs in areas of mixed sand, rubble, and coral on seaward reefs where it feeds mostly on molluscs, especially prosobranch gastropods) and foraminiferans. Macropharyngodon geoffroy is the type species of the genus Macropharyngodon.

References

geoffroy
Endemic fauna of Hawaii
Fish of Hawaii
Taxa named by Jean René Constant Quoy
Taxa named by Joseph Paul Gaimard
Fish described in 1824